XHCDMX-FM "Violeta Radio" is a community radio station on 106.1 FM in Mexico City. The station describes itself as a "feminist" radio station; its concession is held by Alianza por el Derecho Humano de las Mujeres a Comunicar, A.C. ("Alliance for the Human Right of Women to Communicate"), a civil association formed by several women's organizations and activists.

History
In 2016, the Federal Telecommunications Institute (IFT) reduced mandatory station spacing on the FM band from 800 kHz to 400 kHz; this, along with the 2014 designation of 106-108 MHz as a reserved band for community and indigenous radio stations and the 2013 recognition of such stations in broadcasting law, opened the door for two new radio stations to be awarded in Mexico City.

The concessionaire was formed by two civil associations—Salud Integral para la Mujer, A.C. (SIPAM) and Comunicación e Información de la Mujer, A.C. (CIMAC)—as well as Aimée Vega Montiel, a researcher at the UNAM Center for Interdisciplinary Studies in the Sciences and Humanities (CEIICH), to pursue one of the new frequencies to be made available, filing an application in May 2016. On August 23, 2017, the IFT's seven commissioners voted unanimously to award a concession to Alianza por el Derecho Humano de las Mujeres a Comunicar for Mexico City's first licensed community radio station. The concession was formally received on November 29, allowing Alianza to begin construction of the station. XHCDMX-FM was initially projected to sign on in early 2018.

As a radio station operated by women, its most significant antecedent was XEMX-AM 1380 "Radio Femenina", which operated with a format of programs oriented toward women between 1952 and 1960, but was owned by men. As a community station, it joins several licensed stations in the Valley of Mexico, all operating in suburbs within the State of Mexico, including XHNEZ-FM and XHARO-FM in Ciudad Nezahualcóyotl; XHOEX-FM in Texcoco; and XHCHAL-FM in Chalco.

On February 27, 2018, Violeta Radio held a presentation at the Memory and Tolerance Museum to present the new station. At the event, an agreement with Radio Educación was announced by which XHCDMX's antenna would be mounted on the same tower as Radio Educación's FM station. However, Violeta Radio did not construct its facility in 2018 (XHEP-FM itself did not sign on until November). In February 2019, in an interview with El Economista newspaper, new Radio Educación director Gabriel Sosa Plata said that while there had been some delays on Violeta Radio's part, the station was expected to hit the air in May, though XHCDMX began testing on March 14.

Programming
In an interview, Maru Chávez of SIPAM stated that the station is designed as a "counterweight to gender stereotypes" and will feature a variety of programs, including news, from a gender perspective. Vega Montiel described the objective of Violeta Radio as "to produce programs that are useful to women, teens and girls, that discuss human and reproductive rights, labor rights, the right to education". Most of XHCDMX's programming at sign-on will be recorded in Radio Educación studios.

References

Radio stations in Mexico City
Community radio stations in Mexico
Feminism in Mexico
2019 establishments in Mexico
Radio stations established in 2019